Choi Hyun-Tae (born September 15, 1987) is a South Korean football player who plays for Jeju United.

Club career

FC Seoul
On 2 April 2013, during an AFC Champions League match versus Vegalta Sendai, Choi was substituted in the 75th minute for Sergio Escudero. In the 84th minute, back-up goalkeeper Yu Sang-hun was sent off for a bad challenge. Since FC Seoul had used all three of their substitutions, Choi was put in the net to be FC Seoul's outfield goalkeeper for the remainder of the full-time and added-time in which saw him let a penalty go in and handle the ball twice.

External links
 

1987 births
Living people
Association football midfielders
Association football fullbacks
South Korean footballers
FC Seoul players
Gimcheon Sangmu FC players
Jeju United FC players
K League 1 players
K League 2 players
Sportspeople from Busan